Liisa Nevalainen (2 May 1916 – 10 December 1987) was a Finnish actress. She appeared in more than 30 films and television shows between 1934 and 1973.

Selected filmography
 Substitute Wife (1936)
 Red Line (1959)
 Skandaali tyttökoulussa (1960)
 Pojat (1962)

References

External links

1916 births
1987 deaths
Actors from Oulu
People from Oulu Province (Grand Duchy of Finland)
Finnish film actresses
20th-century Finnish actresses